USS Margaret Anderson (SP-1203) was a United States Navy patrol vessel in commission from August to December 1917.

Margaret Anderson was built as a private motorboat of the same name in 1907 by Harrison Lewis. On 15 June 1917, the U.S. Navy acquired her from her owners, W. B. Anderson and N. F. Bonniville, for use as a section patrol boat during World War I. She was commissioned as USS Margaret Anderson (SP-1203) on 16 August 1917.

Assigned to the 5th Naval District and based at Oyster, Virginia, Margaret Anderson served on section patrol duties until at least the end of 1917. She was returned to her owners either on 31 December 1917  or sometime in 1918.

Notes

References

SP-1203 Margaret Anderson at Department of the Navy Naval History and Heritage Command Online Library of Selected Images: U.S. Navy Ships -- Listed by Hull Number "SP" #s and "ID" #s -- World War I Era Patrol Vessels and other Acquired Ships and Craft numbered from SP-1200 through SP-1299
NavSource Online: Section Patrol Craft Photo Archive Margaret Anderson (SP 1203)

Patrol vessels of the United States Navy
World War I patrol vessels of the United States
1907 ships